Nádia Bento de Lima (born 30 July 1966) is a Brazilian basketball player. She competed in the women's tournament at the 1992 Summer Olympics.

References

1966 births
Living people
Brazilian women's basketball players
Olympic basketball players of Brazil
Basketball players at the 1992 Summer Olympics
Basketball players from São Paulo